1. FSV Mainz 05 II is a German association football club from the town of Mainz, Rhineland-Palatinate.

It is the reserve team of 1. FSV Mainz 05. The team's greatest achievement came in 2014 when it won promotion to the 3. Liga for the first time, the highest league a reserve team can play in Germany. During the professional days of the senior side it played as 1. FSV Mainz 05 Amateure but when the senior side itself played at amateur level, from 1976 to 1988 and once more in 1989–90, the team played as 1. FSV Mainz 05 II. Since 2005 it has permanently adopted the name 1. FSV Mainz 05 II.

History
The history of the reserve side of Mainz 05 is strongly intertwined with the fortunes of the senior side, having risen to higher league levels when the first team started to enjoy 2. Bundesliga and Bundesliga success. The senior side was a long term member of the Oberliga Südwest from 1945, then a tier one league, to 1963 when the Bundesliga was introduced. Mainz did not qualify for the Bundesliga but played in the tier two Regionalliga Südwest instead. When the 2. Bundesliga was formed the club joined this league in 1974. Mainz played at this level for two seasons before disappearing into amateur football for 12 years. From 1990 the club reestablished itself in professional football and has been playing there since.

The reserve side, in the early years after the Second World War, played mostly in local amateur football. It rose to the tier three Amateurliga Südwest for a season in 1957–58 but came last and was promptly relegated again. It dropped through the 2. Amateurliga Rheinhessen as well but made a return to this league in 1973, being relegated again in 1977. It returned to what had now become the Bezirksliga Rheinhessen in 1981 for three seasons. After this the team did not make another appearance in the higher amateur leagues again until the late 1990s, having been disbanded for a time in between.

In 1996 the club, freshly promoted to the Bezirksliga Rheinhessen (VII), won a league title and promotion, followed by a championship in the Landesliga Südwest-Ost (VI) in 1997. It entered the Verbandsliga Südwest (V) for two seasons before another title in 1999 took the team up to the Oberliga.

The club spent the next four seasons in the Oberliga Südwest as a top of the table side, culminating in a second-place finish in 2002 and a league championship the year after. The later took the side to the side to the tier three Regionalliga Süd where it experienced two difficult seasons before being relegated again in 2005. In this era the club also saw five consecutive South West Cup wins from 2001 to 2005, a competition the team has been barred from like all reserve sides in Germany, following a rule change in 2008. Each of those cup wins entitled the club to enter the German Cup where it was knocked out in the first round at each occasion.

Another three good seasons in the Oberliga Südwest followed in which Mainz 05 II finished third, second and, eventually in 2008, league champions again. This time promotion took the club up to the Regionalliga West, a newly introduced league that was formed alongside the introduction of the 3. Liga that year. The first season there saw the club come fifth, the following three seasons after that it finished much lower.

Another change in the league system in 2012 saw the introduction of the Regionalliga Südwest, in which Mainz 05 II was now placed. In this league te club came eleventh in its first season there.

The 2013–14 Regionalliga season saw the best performance of the club at this level, finishing third. Because runners-up SC Freiburg II declined the opportunity to take part in the promotion round, choosing not to apply for a 3. Liga license, Mainz received its spot instead. There the team won promotion to the 3. Liga after overcoming Regionalliga Nordost champions TSG Neustrelitz 5–1 on aggregate in the promotion round.

Stadium
1. FSV Mainz 05 II plays its home games in the Bruchwegstadion which hosts 20,300 spectators and used to be the home ground of the first team until it moved to the Coface Arena in 2011.

Players

Current squad

Honours
The club's honours:

League
 Oberliga Südwest (IV)
 Champions: 2003, 2008
 Runners-up: 2002, 2007
 Verbandsliga Südwest (V)
 Champions: 1999
 Landesliga Südwest-Ost (VI)
 Champions: 1997
 Bezirksliga Rheinhessen (VII)
 Champions: 1996

Cup
 South West Cup
 Winners: 2001, 2002, 2003, 2004, 2005
 Runners-up: 2006

Recent seasons
The recent season-by-season performance of the club:

 With the introduction of the Regionalligas in 1994 and the 3. Liga in 2008 as the new third tier, below the 2. Bundesliga, all leagues below dropped one tier.

References

External links
 
Das deutsche Fußball-Archiv  historical German domestic league tables
1. FSV Mainz 05 II at Weltfussball.de 

II
Football clubs in Germany
Rhineland-Palatinate reserve football teams
German reserve football teams
Sport in Mainz
3. Liga clubs